An animal stall is an enclosure housing one or a few animals. Stalls for animals can often be found wherever animals are kept: a horse stable is often a purpose-built and permanent structure.  A farmer's barn may be subdivided into animal stalls or pens for cows and other livestock.

Tie stalls are a type of stall where animals are tethered at the neck to their stall. It is mostly used in the dairy industry, although horses might also be stalled in tie stalls (often referred to as stands or straight stalls). Typical the barn has two rows of stalls, where the cow is tied up for resting, feeding, milking and watering. This type of housing is used in both regular and organic farming.

Horse care
Mares with foals often are kept in double stalls. Stallions, kept alone with less access to turnout, are also often given larger quarters. Box stalls usually contain a layer of absorbent bedding such as straw or wood shavings and need to be cleaned daily. Depending on the environmental conditions and the needs of the horses, stalls may be cleaned multiple times a day - especially during winter seasons when turnout is limited, for show horses that receive meticulous grooming, or for horses recovering from injuries. Keeping stalls, paddocks, and pastures clean is one of the most important things to manage when considering the overall cleanliness and health (especially respiratory health) of horses.

Prior to the late 20th century, the tie stall or standing stall was a more common housing for working horses that were taken out daily. Taking only half the size of a box stall, more animals could be housed in a single barn or stable.

References

Horse management
Livestock